"Let Her Go" is a 2012 song by Passenger.

Let Her Go may also refer to:

Music
 "Let Her Go" (Mark Collie song), 1991
 "Let Her Go" (The Kid Laroi song), 2019
 Let Her Go, 2014 EP by Glen Templeton
 "Let Her Go", by Miss Li from God Put a Rainbow in the Sky, 2007
 "Let Her Go", by The Lodger, 2006
 "Let Her Go", by Lulu on Take Me to Your Heart Again, 1982
 "Let Her Go", by Steve Alaimo from Steve Alaimo Sings and Swings, 1964
 "Let Her Go", by Strawberry Switchblade from the album Strawberry Switchblade, 1985
 "Let Her Go", by David Cassidy on Old Trick New Dog, 1998
 "Let Her Go", by Blu Cantrell from Bittersweet, 2003
 "Let Her Go", by Gil Grand from Somebody's Someone, 2006
 "Let Her Go", by Point Blank from On a Roll, 1982
 "Let Her Go", by South Korean rock band F.T. Island from Five Treasure Box, 2012
 "Let Her Go", by jazz flautist Hubert Laws from Flute By-Laws, 1966
 "Let Her Go", by Craig David from The Story Goes..., 2005
 "Let Her Go", by  Less Than Jake from In with the Out Crowd, 2006
 "Let Her Go", by Cheap Trick from Woke Up with a Monster, 1994
 "Let Her Go", by Dan Fogelberg from Windows and Walls, 1984
 "Let Her Go", by Mac Demarco from Salad Days, 2014

Television
"Let Her Go", an episode of Life
"Let Her Go", an episode of Chicago Fire
"Let Her Go",  an episode of The Vampire Diaries

See also
 "Don't Cry, Joe (Let Her Go, Let Her Go, Let Her Go)", 1949 song by Johnny Desmond
 Let It Go (disambiguation)
 Let Me Go (disambiguation)